Irma Roy (10 June 1932 – 14 June 2016) was an Argentine actress and politician who served in the Chamber of Deputies from 1995 to 2005. Her daughters, Carolina Papaleo, Lydia Valeiento also became actresses.

She died on 14 June 2016 at the age of 84.

Selected filmography
La serpiente de cascabel (1948)
Al Compás de tu Mentira (1950)
Cinco grandes y una chica (1950)
Historia de una noche de niebla (1950)
The Beautiful Brummel (1951)
Caídos en el infierno (1954)
Requiebro (1955)
Mi marido y mi novio (1955)
El Derecho a la felicidad (1968)
Las Venganzas de Beto Sánchez (1973)

References

External links

1932 births
2016 deaths
20th-century Argentine actresses
Argentine film actresses
Argentine telenovela actresses
Actresses from Buenos Aires
Argentine actor-politicians
Justicialist Party politicians
Members of the Argentine Chamber of Deputies elected in Buenos Aires Province
Burials at La Chacarita Cemetery